Test cricket is played between international cricket teams who are Full Members of the International Cricket Council (ICC). Unlike One Day Internationals, Test matches consist of two innings per team, with no limit in the number of overs. Test cricket is first-class cricket, so statistics and records set in Test matches are also counted toward first-class records. The duration of Tests, currently limited to five days, has varied through Test history, ranging from three days to timeless matches. The earliest match now recognised as a Test was played between England and Australia in March 1877; since then there have been over 2,000 Tests played by 13 teams. The frequency of Tests has steadily increased partly because of the increase in the number of Test-playing countries, and partly as cricket boards seek to maximise their revenue.

Cricket is, by its nature, capable of generating large numbers of records and statistics. This list details the most significant team and individual records in Test cricket.

, the most successful team in Test cricket, in terms of both wins and win percentage, is Australia, having won 404 of their 851 Tests (47.47%). Excluding teams who have only played a small number of Tests, the least successful team are Bangladesh.

Australian Donald Bradman, widely considered the greatest batsman of all time, holds several personal and partnership records. He scored the most runs in a series, has the most double centuries and was a part of the record 5th wicket partnership. His most significant record is his batting average of 99.94. One of cricket's most famous statistics, it still stands almost 40 runs higher than any other batsman's career average. Don Bradman is the only player in the world to have scored 5000 runs against a single opposition: 5028 runs against England.

In the Manchester Test of 1956, England spin bowler Jim Laker took 19 wickets for 90 runs (19–90) which set not only the Test record for best match figures but also the first-class one. In taking 10–53 in the second innings he became the first bowler to capture all ten wickets in a Test match innings, and his analysis remains the best innings figures. Indian leg spinner Anil Kumble was the second bowler to take 10 wickets in an innings, claiming 10–74 against Pakistan in 1999. In December 2021, New Zealand spinner, Ajaz Patel became the third bowler to take 10 wickets in an innings. 
West Indies batsman Brian Lara has the highest individual score in Test cricket: he scored 400 not out against England in 2004 to surpass the innings of 380 by Matthew Hayden six months earlier. Lara had held the record before Hayden, with a score of 375 against England 10 years earlier. Pakistan's Misbah-ul-Haq holds the record of the fastest Test half century, scoring 50 runs from 21 balls. The record for the fastest Test century is held by New Zealand's Brendon McCullum, who scored 100 runs from 54 balls in his final Test match.

The trend of countries to increase the number of Test matches they play means that the aggregate lists are dominated by modern players. Sri Lankan spinner Muttiah Muralitharan became the highest Test wicket-taker in December 2007, when he passed Shane Warne's total of 708 wickets. Within a year, the equivalent batting record of highest run-scorer had also changed hands: Sachin Tendulkar surpassed the tally of 11,953 runs by Brian Lara. The record for most dismissals by a wicket-keeper is held by Mark Boucher of South Africa while the record for most catches by a fielder is held by Rahul Dravid.

Listing criteria 
In general the top five are listed in each category (except when there is a tie for the last place among the five, when all the tied record holders are noted).

Listing notation 
Team notation
 (300–3) indicates that a team scored 300 runs for three wickets and the innings was closed, either due to a successful run chase or if no playing time remained
 (300–3 d) indicates that a team scored 300 runs for three wickets, and declared its innings closed
 (300) indicates that a team scored 300 runs and was all out

Batting notation
 (100) indicates that a batsman scored 100 runs and was out
 (100*) indicates that a batsman scored 100 runs and was not out

Bowling notation
 (5–100) indicates that a bowler has captured 5 wickets while conceding 100 runs

Currently playing
  indicates a current Test cricketer

Seasons
 Domestic cricket seasons in Australia, New Zealand, South Africa, India, Pakistan, Sri Lanka, Bangladesh, Zimbabwe and the West Indies may span two calendar years, and are by convention said to be played in (e.g.) "2008–09". A cricket season in England is described as a single year. e.g. "2009". An international Test series may be for a much shorter duration, and Cricinfo treats this issue by stating "any series or matches which began between May and September of any given year will appear in the relevant single year season and any that began between October and April will appear in the relevant cross-year season". In the record tables, a two-year span generally indicates that the record was set within a domestic season in one of the above named countries.

Team records

Team wins, losses and draws

Result records

Greatest win margins (by innings)

Greatest win margin (by runs)

Matches that finished with scores level

Narrowest win margin (by wickets)

Narrowest win margin (by runs)

Victory after following-on

Most consecutive wins

Team scoring records

Aggregate scoring records

Individual records

Individual records (batting)

Career runs

Most runs at each batting position

Highest career batting average

Innings or series

Calendar year

Highest scores at each batting position

Innings as captain

Innings carrying the bat

Most runs in an over

Centuries

Half-centuries

Most fours in career

Most sixes in career

Ducks

Individual records (bowling)

Most wickets in a career

Most wickets in a career – Progression of record

Fastest to multiples of 50 wickets

Best career bowling average

Best career strike rate

Most 5 wickets in an innings

Most 10 wickets in a match

Series

Innings

Match records

Innings as captain

Match records as captain

Individual records (fielding)

Most catches in Test career

Individual records (wicket-keeping)

Individual records (as an all-rounder)

Individual records (other)

Partnership records

Highest partnership for each wicket

Highest partnerships

Highest overall partnership runs by a pair

See also 

List of Afghanistan Test cricket records
List of Australia Test cricket records
List of Bangladesh Test cricket records
List of England Test cricket records
List of India Test cricket records
List of Ireland Test cricket records
List of New Zealand Test cricket records
List of Pakistan Test cricket records
List of South Africa Test cricket records
List of Sri Lanka Test cricket records
List of West Indies Test cricket records
List of Zimbabwe Test cricket records
List of Cricket records
List of One Day International cricket records
List of Twenty20 International records

References

External links 
 Records – Test matches ESPN Cricinfo
 HowSTAT!
 Test Records Cricket-Records.com
 Wisden Records in Test Matches Wisden 

Test cricket records